The Field Elm cultivar Ulmus minor 'Umbraculifera' [:shade-giving] was originally cultivated in Iran, where it was widely planted as an ornamental and occasionally grew to a great size, being known there as 'Nalband'  [:the tree of the farriers] ("the famous 'Smithy elm' of Persia, where its dense top often forms the shelter of the native forgers"<ref>[https://archive.org/details/descriptivecatal1893shad/page/n3 Descriptive Catalogue of Shady Hill Nursery], Cambridge, Massachusetts, 1893, p.3</ref>). Litvinov considered it a cultivar of a wild elm with a dense crown that he called U. densa, from the mountains of Turkestan, Ferghana, and Aksu. Non-rounded forms of 'Umbraculifera' are also found in Isfahan Province, Iran. Zielińksi in Flora Iranica considered it an U. minor cultivar.

'Umbraculifera' was introduced to Europe in 1878 by the Späth nursery of Berlin, by one account from a German gardener in the employ of the Shah of Persia, by another from M. Scharrer, inspector of Tiflis Imperial Gardens, Georgia. It was subsequently planted along streets in Berlin.  Späth, along with Hesse of Weener, marketed the tree till the 1930s. 
 
'Umbraculifera' was introduced to the United States in 1912 as "Karagatch" (Ulmus densa syn. U. campestris [:U. minor] 'Umbraculifera') at the USDA's Chico Plant Introduction Station in California by Frank Meyer, who collected it from the Russian imperial estate at Murgrab, Turkestan (see photo taken by Meyer in 'Notable trees' below).

Green mistook Späth's U. turkestanica Regel (the U. 'Turkestanica' of his Register of Cultivars) for a synonym of 'Umbraculifera'. Späth listed U. turkestanica Regel and U. campestris umbraculifera separately in his catalogues, where 'Umbraculifera' appears as "Ball elm. Transcaucasia, Persia. Needs no pruning. Valuable as a single tree, free-standing in park or street".Späth, L., Catalogue 89 (1892-93; Berlin), p.116 

Description
The tree is distinguished by its dense, rounded, sometimes flat-topped habit. Henry's statement (1913) that "it differs from ordinary U. nitens [: U. minor] only in its peculiar habit" suggests that, in one form of the tree at least, the leaf is not distinctive. A leaf-specimen labelled U. umbraculifera held in the herbarium of the Muséum National d'Histoire Naturelle appears to confirm this suggestion. However, a leaf-specimen labelled U. umbraculifera Späth held in the herbarium of the Naturalis Biodiversity Center in Leiden shows that the clone marketed by the Späth nursery had a distinctive, almost rhomboidal leaf. The tree is reputedly always grafted on to U. minor standards. It grows 5 to 8 ft in diameter in twelve to fifteen years. An early 20th-century photograph in Schedae ad Herbarium florae URSS (1922), shows that 'Umbraculifera' ('Bubyriana') is not dissimilar in appearance to its putative hybrid Ulmus 'Androssowii'.

Pests and diseases
The tree is as vulnerable to Dutch elm disease as the species. 

Cultivation
The tree was introduced to the Caucasus, Armenia and Turkestan, and it remains in cultivation in central and south-west Asia. Bean remarked that the tree succeeded well on the continent (Europe) and in eastern North America, but was rarely planted in the UK. Henry (1913) mentions an example at Kew Gardens, obtained in 1904 from Simon-Louis of Metz, France. A specimen stood in the Ryston Hall arboretum, Norfolk, in the early 20th century. The tree featured, as "Späth's globe-headed elm", on the cover of the 1913 catalogue of Klehms' nurseries  of Arlington Heights, Illinois, with a detailed description.Klehms' Nurseries, Arlington Heights, Illinois, Price list 1913, cover Klehms' propagated the clone in quantity. In 1947 the nearly two-mile long avenue of 30 year-old 'Umbraculifera' along 19th Avenue Boulevard in Moline, Illinois, was described as "the only street of Globe-heads in the country". Trees Magazine, May-June 1947: Vol 7 Issue 4; cover Introduced to Australia, the tree was marketed in the early 20th century by the Gembrook Nursery near Melbourne, and by Searl's Garden Emporium, Sydney, but it is not known whether the tree survives in that country. Despite its susceptibility to Dutch elm disease, it remains in commercial cultivation in Belgium and the Netherlands.

Putative specimens in Budapest
A field elm cultivar in the People's Park, Budapest, in the early 20th century, presumably grafted at ground level and trained to a neat cone, illustrated in Möller's Deutsche Gärtner-Zeitung (1918) as Ulmus campestris als Pyramidenbaum [:field elm as pyramidal tree], may have been trimmed 'Umbraculifera'. 

Varieties
The Field Elm cultivar Ulmus minor 'Umbraculifera Gracilis' was obtained as a sport of 'Umbraculifera' by Späth c.1897-8.

Notable trees
Regel's Gartenflora (1881) contains an illustration, mentioned by Elwes and Henry in their account of 'Umbraculifera', of a great old tree near Eriwan. An avenue of dense globose trees, considered 'Umbraculifera' by Meyer at a time when the hybrid 'Androssowii' determination was unknown, once grew at the Russian imperial estate of Murgrab at Bairam-ali near Merv, formerly Russian Turkestan.

Synonymy

Karagatch, also applied to Central Asian field elms generally and to the hybrid cultivar Ulmus 'Karagatch' 
Narwan: The common name for 'elm' in Persian, nār-van [:elm-tree], confusingly similar to the local name for the pomegranate, anār-van [:pomegranate-tree]. In Tehran, Umbraculifera is called nārvan-e čatrī [:canopy-like elm].Ulmus densa var. nalband Talibov  Ulmus densa var. bubyriana: Litv., Schedae ad Herbarium Florae Rossicae 6: 163, no. 1991, t.1, 2, 1908 and  Schedae ad Herbarium Florae Rossicae 8: 23, no. 2444, t. 2, 1922 resp. In the latter, Litvinov described it from a cultivated tree in Samarkand.

Hybrid cultivars
 Ulmus × androssowii

Accessions

Europe
Hortus Botanicus Nationalis, Salaspils, Latvia. Acc. no. 18147

North America
Washington Park Arboretum, Seattle, Washington, US. Acc. no. 602-39J. C. Raulston Arboretum, Friends of the Arboretum Newsletter, Number 22, August 1991, item 25; jcra.ncsu.edu

Nurseries

Europe
Boomwekerijen 'De Batterijen', Ochten, Netherlands. .
Kwekerij Johan Van Herreweghe , Schellebelle, Belgium.
Jacobs Plantencentrum , Venlo, Netherlands.
Kwekerij De Reebock , Zwalm, Belgium.
Tuincentrum Semperflorens , Roosendaal, Netherlands.
Tuincentrum Vechtweelde , Maarssen, Netherlands.

References

External links
  Sheet described as U. campestris umbraculifera (Späth) 
 Sheet described as U. campestris L. f. umbraculifera Späth
 Sheet described as U. carpinifolia Gled. cv. 'Umbraculifera' (Trautv.)
 
 
 
   Sheet described as U. campestris umbraculifera'' Späth
 U. densa var. bubyriana Litvinov kiki.huh.harvard.edu

Field elm cultivar
Ulmus articles with images
Ulmus